Riverside Township is a civil township of Missaukee County in the U.S. state of Michigan. The population was 1,179 at the 2010 census.

Communities 
Joseph Nederhoed was the first postmaster.
 Galt was the name of a post office and settlement in the township. William McBain was the first postmaster when the office was established on June 23, 1874. The office closed on January 20, 1879, re-opened on March 28, 1879, and was discontinued on September 15, 1908.  Locally it was known as "Galt Farms."

Geography

The Clam River runs through the northeast corner of the township.

Highway
 runs through the southwest portion of the township and also forms the western border north of the city of McBain.

Demographics
As of the census of 2000, there were 1,050 people, 320 households, and 263 families residing in the township. There were 409 housing units at an average density of 11.5 per square mile (4.4/km). The racial makeup of the township was 96.00% White, 1.24% African American, 0.10% Native American, 0.10% Asian, 0.86% from other races, and 1.71% from two or more races. Hispanic or Latino of any race were 2.19% of the population.

There were 320 households, out of which 40.9% had children under the age of 18 living with them, 72.2% were married couples living together, 6.9% had a female householder with no husband present, and 17.8% were non-families. 14.1% of all households were made up of individuals, and 7.2% had someone living alone who was 65 years of age or older.  The average household size was 2.96 and the average family size was 3.27.

In the township the population was spread out, with 27.4% under the age of 18, 7.9% from 18 to 24, 27.2% from 25 to 44, 18.6% from 45 to 64, and 18.9% who were 65 years of age or older.  The median age was 38 years. For every 100 females, there were 100.4 males.  For every 100 females age 18 and over, there were 93.9 males.

The median income for a household in the township was $37,857, and the median income for a family was $39,732. Males had a median income of $29,338 versus $23,906 for females. The per capita income for the township was $16,167.  About 7.3% of families and 10.3% of the population were below the poverty line, including 14.8% of those under age 18 and none of those age 65 or over.

References

Townships in Missaukee County, Michigan
Townships in Michigan
Populated places established in 1909
1909 establishments in Michigan